A corral is an enclosure for livestock.

Corral may also refer to:

Places
Corral, Chile, a town and municipality in Chile
Corral, Idaho, an unincorporated community in the United States
Corral Bay

Other uses
Corral (defense), a defense circle of wagons
Corral (film), a 1954 National Film Board of Canada documentary
Corral (puzzle), a logic puzzle
Corral (surname), a surname

See also
Corral del Carbón, a building in Granada, Andalusia (Spain)

Coral (disambiguation)